Hugo Pellicer Parisi (born August 1, 1984) is a male diver from Brazil, who competed at four consecutive Summer Olympic Games for his native country, starting in 2004. A member of  he claimed two silver medals at the 2008 South American Swimming Championships in São Paulo.

References

External links

1984 births
Living people
Brazilian male divers
Divers at the 2004 Summer Olympics
Divers at the 2007 Pan American Games
Divers at the 2008 Summer Olympics
Divers at the 2011 Pan American Games
Divers at the 2012 Summer Olympics
Divers at the 2016 Summer Olympics
Olympic divers of Brazil
Brazilian people of Italian descent
Sportspeople from Brasília
Divers at the 2015 Pan American Games
South American Games gold medalists for Brazil
South American Games bronze medalists for Brazil
South American Games silver medalists for Brazil
South American Games medalists in diving
Competitors at the 2010 South American Games
Competitors at the 2014 South American Games
Universiade medalists in diving
Universiade bronze medalists for Brazil
Pan American Games competitors for Brazil
21st-century Brazilian people